"Then I Walked Away" is a song by Australian recording artist Wendy Matthews. It was released in May 1997 as the lead single from her fourth studio album, Ghosts. The song peaked at number 75 on the Australian charts.

At the ARIA Music Awards of 1997, the song was nominated for ARIA Award for Best Female Artist.

Track listing
 "Then I Walked Away" (Edit) - 4:12
 "Sweet Love" - 4:21
 "Unfurl the Coil"	- 4:37

Charts

References

1997 singles
1997 songs
Wendy Matthews songs